The Lent Bumps 2007 was a series of rowing races held at Cambridge University from Tuesday 27 February 2007 until Saturday 3 March 2007. The event was run as a bumps race and was the last set in the series of Lent Bumps which have been held annually in late-February or early March in this form since 1887. See Lent Bumps for the format of the races. In 2007, a total of 121 crews took part (69 men's crews and 52 women's crews), with nearly 1100 participants in total.

Head of the River crews
  men took the Headship ending 's 19-day defence by bumping them on the 1st day.

 became only the second club ever in Cambridge bumps history to hold a double headship.  had previously held a double-headship in the May Bumps for 2000 and 2002 and in the Lent Bumps 2003.

Highest 2nd VIIIs

Links to races in other years

Bumps Charts
Below are the bumps charts all 4 men's and all 3 women's divisions, with the men's event on the left and women's event on the right. The bumps chart represents the progress of every crew over all four days of the racing. To follow the progress of any particular crew, simply find the crew's name on the left side of the chart and follow the line to the end-of-the-week finishing position on the right of the chart.

Note that this chart may not be displayed correctly if you are using a large font size on your browser. A simple way to check is to see that the first horizontal bold line, marking the boundary between divisions, lies between positions 17 and 18.

The Getting-on Race
The Getting-on Race (GoR) allows a number of crews which did not already have a place from last year's races to compete for the right to race this year. Up to ten crews are removed from the bottom of last year's finishing order, who must then race alongside new entrants to decide which crews gain a place (with one bumps place per 3 crews competing, subject to the maximum of 10 available places).

The 2007 Lent Bumps Getting-on Race took place on 23 February 2007.

A total of 17 men's and 24 women's crews took part, competing for the bottom 6 men's spaces and bottom 8 women's spaces in the main bumps races.

Successful crews
The successful crews were (in the order that they were put onto the main start order);

Men

Women

References 

Lent Bumps results
Lent Bumps
2007 in English sport